Lefty is  a nickname for a person who is left-handed. Lefty may refer to:

Lefty Bates (1920–2007), American Chicago blues guitarist
Lefty Bertrand (1909–2002), Major League Baseball pitcher for one game
Steve Carlton (born 1944), American Major League Baseball Hall of Fame pitcher
Cliff Chambers (1922–2012), American Major League Baseball pitcher
Lefty Clarke (1896–1975), Major League Baseball pitcher for one game
Lefty Driesell (born 1931), American college basketball coach
Lefty Frizzell (1928–1975), American country music singer and songwriter
Lefty Gomez (1908–1989), Mexican-American Major League Baseball pitcher
Lefty Grove (1900–1975), American Baseball Hall of Fame pitcher
Lefty Herring (1880–1965), American Major League Baseball player
Lefty Kreh (1925-2018), fly fisherman and photographer
Frank Killen (1870–1939), American baseball pitcher
Lefty Leifield (1883–1970), American Major League Baseball pitcher
Lefty Marr (1862–1912), American Major League Baseball player
Lefty O'Doul (1897–1969), American Major League Baseball player and minor league manager 
Phil Mickelson (born 1970), American professional golfer
Lefty Phillips (1919–1972), American Major League Baseball coach, manager, scout and executive
Frank Rosenthal (1929–2008), American sports handicapper, Las Vegas casino executive, bookmaker and organized crime associate
Lefty Ruggiero (1926–1994), American mobster
Lefty Stewart (1900–1974), American Major League Baseball pitcher
Lew Tendler (1898–1970), American Hall-of-Fame boxer
Lefty Tyler (1889–1953), American Major League Baseball pitcher
Lefty Weinert (1900–1973), American Baseball Hall of Fame pitcher
Lefty Wilkie (1914–1992), Canadian Major League Baseball pitcher
Lefty Williams (1893–1959), American Baseball Hall of Fame pitcher involved in the Black Sox scandal
An on-air name for American disc jockey Captain Mikey, born Marion Elbridge Herrington (1935–1997)
 Lefty, main character in Texas Chainsaw Massacre 2.

See also
Gaius Mucius Scaevola, a brave Roman, possibly mythical, youth who earned the cognomen Scaevola, meaning left-handed

Lists of people by nickname